Allexis cauliflora is a species of plant in the Violaceae family. It is found in Ghana and Nigeria. It is threatened by habitat loss.

References

Violaceae
Vulnerable plants
Taxonomy articles created by Polbot